Edward Parry  (1862 – May 1922) was the second Prefect of the Prefecture Apostolic of Zambese. He was appointed in January 1920 and served until his death in 1922. (Before it was a Prefecture Apostolic, he was its Superior from 1911 to 1915.)

External links
 Catholic Hierarchy profile

People from Harare
White Rhodesian people
1922 deaths
1862 births
Rhodesian Jesuits
20th-century Roman Catholic priests
19th-century Roman Catholic priests
Roman Catholic bishops of Harare